The table below chronicles the achievements of Gilan's Football Club in the top division since 1970.

Iranian football club statistics
Sport in Gilan Province